The Helmschmied family of Augsburg were one of late medieval Europe's foremost families of armourers. Their name, sometimes also spelled Helmschmid, translates to helmet smith. The family's most prominent members were Lorenz Helmschmied (floruit 1467-1515), Kolman Helmschmied (1471–1532) and Desiderius Kolman Helmschmied (1513–1579).

The Helmschmieds made armour for the high nobility of the Holy Roman Empire, including multiple emperors, for rulers of the Spanish Empire, for the archdukes of Austria and Tyrol, as well as other wealthy clients. They competed for fame and noble patronage with the other two most prominent late 15th century European armour smith families, the Seusenhofers of Innsbruck (Austria) and the Missaglias of Milan.

Many works that the Helmschmieds made for Charles V, Holy Roman Emperor and Philip II of Spain are preserved in the Royal Armoury of Madrid, and many of their other works are kept in the Kunsthistorisches Museum in Vienna.

Gallery

References

Further reading
 (see index)

Armourers
Families of German ancestry
History of Augsburg

Surnames of German origin